Urmas Välbe (born 8 November 1966 in Antsla) is a former Estonian cross-country skier. He currently works in a service team of the Russian national cross-country skiing team.

Urmas Välbe was married to Russian cross-country skier Yelena Välbe.

Achievements

References

External links
Urmas Välbe at Sports Reference

1966 births
Living people
Estonian male cross-country skiers
Olympic cross-country skiers of Estonia
Cross-country skiers at the 1992 Winter Olympics
Cross-country skiers at the 1994 Winter Olympics
People from Antsla
20th-century Estonian people